Made in Space may refer to:

 Made in Space (album), a 2011 album by Francis Dunnery
 Made In Space, Inc., an American aerospace company